Oberdorla is a village and a former municipality in the Unstrut-Hainich-Kreis district of Thuringia, Germany. Since 31 December 2012, it is part of the municipality Vogtei.

References

Former municipalities in Thuringia